José Manuel Arcos Gil (born 19 January 1973 in Valladolid) is a retired Spanish pole vaulter.

His personal best jump was 5.76 metres, achieved in June 1996 in Madrid. He had 5.80 metres on the indoor track, achieved in February 1999 in Zaragoza.

Achievements

1No mark in the final

References

sports-reference

1973 births
Living people
Spanish male pole vaulters
Athletes (track and field) at the 1996 Summer Olympics
Olympic athletes of Spain